Kolathur is a neighborhood located in the northwestern region of Chennai, India.

Demographics 
As per Census of India 2011, the total population of Kolathur, Chennai was 1,10,474. Out of this, the male population contributed 55,689 whereas the female population was 54,785. Out of this, 15,214 (males: 7,695 and females: 7,519) were Scheduled Castes and 552 (males: 289 and females: 263) were Scheduled Tribes. The population of children below 6 years of age was 11,760 (males: 6,091 and females: 5,669). Literates of Kolathur constitute 92,248, out of which males were 47,663 and females were 44,585.

Education

Schools
Some of the important schools in Kolathur are Everwin Vidhyashram, Don Bosco Higher Secondary School, Government Higher Secondary School and Everwin Matriculation Higher Secondary School. And Durgadevi Choudary Vivekananda Vidyalaya is another famous school.

College
Arulmigu Kapaleeswarar Arts and Science College

Political notability 
Kolathur (Chennai) has the Division (ward) number (New ward number 64 / (old number 62) with voters strength of nearly 70,000. Kolathur (state assembly constituency), Chennai, has 1.98 lakh voters. Kolathur lies in the Ward number 64 (old number 62) of the Greater Chennai Corporation.

Kolathur comes under the zone VI (six) of Chennai Corporation viz. Thiru. Vi. Ka Nagar Zone.
 
This neighborhood comes under Kolathur (state assembly constituency). Kolathur (state assembly constituency) is one of the six Assembly Constituencies that constitute Chennai North (Lok Sabha constituency).

Places of worship 
Shri Somanatha Swamy Temple.
Shri Lakshmi Narayana Perumal Temple, Kolathur.

Geolocation

References

Further reading 
 

Neighbourhoods in Chennai
Suburbs of Chennai